is a former Japanese football player.

Playing career
Masuda was born in Saitama Prefecture on April 30, 1976. After graduating from high school, he played for Bolivian and Brazilian club. In 1998, he returned to Japan and joined J1 League club Verdy Kawasaki. However he could hardly play in the match. In 1999, he moved to new club Yokohama FC in Japan Football League. He played many matches as offensive midfielder. The club also won the champions in 1999 and 2000 and was promoted to J2 League from 2001. He played for the club until 2004. In 2005, he played for Regional Leagues club Sun Miyazaki and Prefectural Leagues club FC Machida Zelvia. He retired end of 2005 season.

Club statistics

References

External links

yfc.unofficial.jp

1976 births
Living people
Association football people from Saitama Prefecture
Japanese footballers
J1 League players
J2 League players
Japan Football League players
Tokyo Verdy players
Yokohama FC players
Estrela Miyazaki players
FC Machida Zelvia players
Association football midfielders